Mala Ram Gangwal (born 14 August 1949), is an Indian politician, belonging to Indian National Congress. He is member of the legislative assembly representing Madipur constituency, a seat he has won three times.

Post held

Post held

References

Indian National Congress politicians from Delhi
1949 births
Living people